Skräbeån is a river in the south of Sweden. It is located in the eastern part of Skåne province, in Bromölla Municipality.

References

Rivers of Skåne County